is a Japanese football player for Roasso Kumamoto.

Club statistics
Updated to 23 February 2018.

References

External links

Profile at Roasso Kumamoto

1995 births
Living people
Association football people from Kumamoto Prefecture
Japanese footballers
J2 League players
J3 League players
Roasso Kumamoto players
J.League U-22 Selection players
Association football midfielders